Cue is a clothing store that was established in 1968. Its first store opened in the Strand Arcade, Sydney, Australia. Cue predominantly sells modern fashion from London and exclusive prints.

History
Cue was opened in 1968 and is still wholly owned by the founding family. Designs seen in Cue stores are ones that originate from Cue's head office in Surry Hills, Sydney, and most clothing is made in Australia. Cue works with fabric mills in Europe to develop fabrics to the design teams' own specifications and print designs.

Cue has stores in all major cities throughout Australia and New Zealand, with a store in each Myer, the exclusive department store home of Cue, nationally

Awards

2011 
 Prix de Marie Claire Awards – Winner Best Australian Fashion Brand 
 Grazia Fashion Awards – Winner Favourite Overall High Street Chain

2010 
 Myer Supplier of the Year Awards – Winner Community Services Award

2009 
 TNT Ragtrader Fashion Retailer of the Year Awards – Winner Fashion Retailer of the Year  
 Prix de Marie Claire Awards – Finalist Best Australian Fashion Brand

2007 
 Marie Claire Prix de Excellence Awards – Winner Best Australian Fashion Brand 
 Harper's Bazaar Online Style Awards – Winner Best Australian Fashion Store 
 Myer Supplier of the Year Awards – Winner Supplier of the Year 
 Myer Supplier of the Year Awards – Winner Myer Concession – Store Within Our Store Award

2018 

 Online Retail Industry Awards – Winner Best In-Store Initiative

2019 

 Online Retail Industry Awards – Winner Best Multi-channel Retailer
 CX Awards - Winner Best Multi-channel Customer Experience

Notes

References

External links
 Cue Clothing Co. website

1968 establishments in Australia
Australian companies established in 1968
Clothing companies established in 1968
Clothing companies of Australia
Companies based in Sydney